Edward Hanlon Jr. (born 1944) is a retired United States Marine Corps lieutenant general who served as the U.S. Military Representative to the North Atlantic Treaty Organization (NATO) Military Committee and as Commanding General of the Marine Corps Combat Development Command.

His awards include the Defense Superior Service Medal with oak leaf, Legion of Merit with two gold stars, Defense Meritorious Service Medal, Meritorious Service Medal, Navy and Marine Corps Commendation Medal with Combat "V" and gold star, and the Combat Action Ribbon.

References

1944 births
Living people
United States Marine Corps generals
Recipients of the Legion of Merit